Psalm 81 is the 81st psalm of the Book of Psalms, beginning in English in the King James Version: "Sing aloud unto God our strength". In the slightly different numbering system used in the Greek Septuagint and Latin Vulgate translations of the Bible, this psalm is Psalm 80. In Latin, it is known as "Exultate deo adiutori nostro". It is one of the 12 Psalms of Asaph. Its themes relate to celebration and repentance. In the New King James Version its sub-title is "An Appeal for Israel's Repentance".

The psalm forms a regular part of Jewish, Catholic, Lutheran, Anglican and other Protestant liturgies. It has been set to music.

Text

Hebrew Bible version 
Following is the Hebrew text of Psalm 81:

King James Version 
The following is the full English text of the Psalm from the King James Bible.
 To the chief Musician upon Gittith, A Psalm of Asaph.
 Sing aloud unto God our strength: make a joyful noise unto the God of Jacob.
 Take a psalm, and bring hither the timbrel, the pleasant harp with the psaltery.
 Blow up the trumpet in the new moon, in the time appointed, on our solemn feast day.
 For this was a statute for Israel, and a law of the God of Jacob.
 This he ordained in Joseph for a testimony, when he went out through the land of Egypt: where I heard a language that I understood not.
 I removed his shoulder from the burden: his hands were delivered from the pots.
 Thou calledst in trouble, and I delivered thee; I answered thee in the secret place of thunder: I proved thee at the waters of Meribah. Selah.
 Hear, O my people, and I will testify unto thee: O Israel, if thou wilt hearken unto me;
 There shall no strange god be in thee; neither shalt thou worship any strange god.
 I am the LORD thy God, which brought thee out of the land of Egypt: open thy mouth wide, and I will fill it.
 But my people would not hearken to my voice; and Israel would none of me.
 So I gave them up unto their own hearts' lust: and they walked in their own counsels.
 Oh that my people had hearkened unto me, and Israel had walked in my ways!
 I should soon have subdued their enemies, and turned my hand against their adversaries.
 The haters of the LORD should have submitted themselves unto him: but their time should have endured for ever.
 He should have fed them also with the finest of the wheat: and with honey out of the rock should I have satisfied thee.

Verse numbering 
In the Hebrew Bible, Psalm 81:1 comprises the designation
To the chief Musician upon Gittith, A Psalm of Asaph. (KJV)
From then on Psalm 81:1–16 in English versions correspond to verses 2–17 in the Hebrew text.

Commentary 

The reference to the new moon and full moon as well as the blowing of the trumpet in verse 3 may reflect the celebration of New Year and Tabernacles. The teaching of verses 9 and 10 is similar to the beginning of the Decalogue, although 'the words for "strange" god and "foreign" god are different from the "other gods" in Exodus 20 and Deuteronomy 5, with the verb "brought [you] up" and the order of the phrases reversed.

The beginning of the psalm is like a hymn (verses 1–5b), which is followed by an oracle (verses 5c–16). In particular, verses 6-10 describe 'God's deliverance of his people from Egypt', whereas verses 11-16 recall the past disobedience of the people and promise to give victory over their enemies if they obey God.

Significance 
Robert Godfrey, Sinclair Ferguson and some others make this the poetic center of the Psalter being the middle book (book 3 of 5), middle Psalm (8 of 17)  and even point to the middle verses of this Psalm (Psalm 81:8,9 with "if only my people would listen").

Uses

Judaism 
 The psalm is recited in its entirety in the Shir Shel Yom of Thursday.
 It is recited on Rosh Hashanah in some traditions.
 It is recited on the sixth day of Sukkot in some traditions.
 Verse 2 is part of Mishnah Tamid 7:4.
 Verse 3 is part of the blessings before the Shema on the second day of Rosh Hashanah.
 Verses 4-5 are part of the daytime Kiddush on Rosh Hashanah.
 Verse 5 is found in the Mussaf Amidah on Rosh Hashanah.
 Verse 11 is the seventh verse of Hoshia Et Amecha in Pesukei Dezimra.

Musical settings 
Heinrich Schütz set Psalm 81 in a metred version in German, "Singet mit Freuden unserm Gott", SWV 178, as part of the Becker Psalter, first published in 1628. George Frideric Handel composed a movement of his Occasional Oratorio, HWV 62, setting verses 1 and 2 c. 1745.

William Walton's 1931 cantata Belshazzar's Feast takes text from the psalm. In 1964, Herman Berlinski used the psalm in English, Sing joyfully, for four-part choir, organ and obbligato trumpet, combining it with texts from the High Holiday Prayerbook). Verses 1-4 were set by Adrian Batten in a sacred anthem entitled "O sing joyfully". Verse 1 was set by Alan Hovhaness for his motet Opus 68 Sing Aloud.

Ofer Ben-Amots set the psalm in Hebrew for mixed choir and metal percussion in 1989. A 2022 song by New Zealand singer Brooke Ligertwood, "Honey in the Rock", is based on verse 16. An al-female a cappella group, Sweet Honey in the Rock, founded in 1973, takes its name from the same verse.

References

External links 

 
 
  in Hebrew and English, Mechon-mamre
 Text of Psalm 81 according to the 1928 Psalter
 For the leader; "upon the gittith." Of Asaph. Sing joyfully to God our strength;a (text and footnotes) United States Conference of Catholic Bishops
 Psalm 81 – Gathering God’s People to Listen and Obey (text and detailed commentary) enduringword.com
 Psalm 81:1 (introduction and text) Bible study tools
 Psalm 81 / Refrain: O come, let us sing to the Lord. Church of England
 Psalm 81 Bible gateway
 Charles H. Spurgeon: Psalm 81 (commentary) spurgeon.org

081